Izvestia (May 5, 1987 – October 21, 1991) was a Thoroughbred racehorse who won the Canadian Triple Crown in 1990.

A grandson of Nearctic, who sired the legendary Northern Dancer, his damsire Personality was the 1970 Co-American Horse of the Year. Owned and bred by Kinghaven Farms, Izvestia began racing in the United States, winning two Graded stakes races at the Keeneland Race Course in Kentucky. He was shipped north in the spring of 1990 to his home base at Woodbine Racetrack in Toronto from which he won the Triple Crown. Having won it a year earlier on With Approval, jockey Don Seymour became the only jockey in history to ride two Canadian Triple Crown winners.

Izvestia's career ended  on October 21, 1991, when he had to be humanely euthanized after breaking a left hind leg in three places while competing in the Rothmans International. In 1999, he was inducted into the Canadian Horse Racing Hall of Fame.

References

External links
Izvestia's Triple Crown wins at YouTube:
 Video at YouTube of  the 1990 Queen's Plate
 Video at YouTube of  the 1990 Prince of Wales Stakes
 Video at YouTube of  the 1990 Breeders Stakes
 Izvestia's pedigree and racing stats

1987 racehorse births
1991 racehorse deaths
Horses who died from racing injuries
Racehorses bred in King, Ontario
Racehorses trained in Canada
King's Plate winners
Sovereign Award winners
Canadian Thoroughbred Horse of the Year
Canadian Horse Racing Hall of Fame inductees
Triple Crown of Thoroughbred Racing winners
Thoroughbred family 2-n